Walter Harzer (September 29, 1912 – May 29, 1982) was a German SS commander during the Nazi era. He commanded the SS Division Hohenstaufen and SS Polizei Division. 

After the war, Harzer became active in HIAG, a lobby group established by senior Waffen-SS men in 1951 in West Germany. He acted as the organisation's official historian, coordinating the writing and publications of revisionist unit histories, which appears in German via the Munin Verlag imprint.

World War II
Born in 1912, Harzer joined the SS in 1931. In March 1934 Harzer joined SS-Verfügungstruppe and was assigned to the Sicherheitsdienst and later the SS Division Das Reich. He participated in the invasion of Poland. From mid-1942 until April 1943 Walter served as a staff officer first with the LVII.Panzer Corps and later with the SS Division Frundsberg.

In April 1943, Harzer was assigned to the SS Division Hohenstaufen. As Hohenstaufen was ordered for a refit in the Netherlands, Harzer became its fifth commander, taking over for Friedrich-Wilhelm Bock. On Sunday 17 September 1944, the Allies launched Operation Market Garden and Harzer’s division was engaged in the Battle of Arnhem. Harzer was awarded the Knight's Cross of the Iron Cross for his actions during these battles.

In October 1944 Harzer became the Chief of Staff of V SS Mountain Corps before receiving the command of the 4th SS Polizei Division at the end of November 1944. Together with the rest of this division Harzer surrendered to the American Army on 8 May 1945.

Post-war activities

After the war Harzer worked as an official historian for HIAG, an organization of former Waffen-SS members. He helped coordinate the writing of numerous tendentious unit histories and memoirs by former Waffen-SS officers. Harzer died in 1982.

Awards
 Knight's Cross of the Iron Cross on 21 September 1944 as SS-Obersturmbannführer and Ia (operations officer) of the 9. SS-Panzer-Division "Hohenstaufen"

References

Citations

Bibliography

 
A Bridge Too Far: The Classic History of the Greatest Battle of World War II by  Cornelius Ryan (Simon & Schuster; Reprint edition (1 May 1995)).
 

1912 births
1982 deaths
Writers from Stuttgart
SS-Standartenführer
Recipients of the Gold German Cross
Recipients of the Knight's Cross of the Iron Cross
People from the Kingdom of Württemberg
Waffen-SS personnel
Military personnel from Stuttgart
German military writers